Trap for Cinderella is a 1965 French-Italian psychological thriller film directed by André Cayatte. It is adapted from Sébastien Japrisot's novel of the same name.

Plot
The young Michèle Isola, who is about to inherit a fortune from her godmother, scarcely survives a terrible fire. When she regains consciousness it becomes evident she suffers with amnesia. Once her physical health is stable again, she is allowed to leave the hospital. Yet the currently mentally fragile patient still needs somebody to take care of her for the time being. Her former nanny Jeanne shall support her. Michèle, who is haunted by flashbacks, appreciates Jeanne's help until certain information arouses her suspicion. In secret she starts now an investigation

Cast
Dany Carrel as Michèle Isola / Dominique Loï
Madeleine Robinson as Jeanne Mureau
Hubert Noël as François
Jean Gaven as Gabriel
René Dary as doctor Doulin
Francis Nani as Serge
Robert Dalban as the garage owner

Release
The film was commercially unsuccessful and stayed in French theaters for only five weeks, generating 120,572 admissions (Cayatte's worst box-office result since 1955's Le Dossier Noir.)  It was broadcast on the French television only once in 1973. The novel's author Japrisot—who disliked the film—blocked the rights for many years keeping it out of circulation.

The film resurfaced at the Lyon Film Festival in 2019, and was released by Gaumont on DVD and Blu-ray in June 2020.

References

External links
 

Piège pour Cendrillon at www.filmsdefrance.com

1965 films
Films about amnesia
Films directed by André Cayatte
French thriller films
1960s French-language films
Italian thriller films
Films based on French novels
Films with screenplays by Jean Anouilh
Films based on works by Sébastien Japrisot
1960s French films
1960s Italian films